Anton Kogler (born 2 May 1939) is an Austrian cross-country skier. He competed in the men's 15 kilometre event at the 1964 Winter Olympics.

References

1939 births
Living people
Austrian male cross-country skiers
Olympic cross-country skiers of Austria
Cross-country skiers at the 1964 Winter Olympics
People from Liezen District
Sportspeople from Styria
20th-century Austrian people